This is a list of Confederate arsenals and armories. The Confederate States of America was a government set up from 1861 to 1865 by eleven Southern slave states that had declared their secession from the United States. The Confederate States Army was the army of the Confederate States of America while the Confederacy existed during the American Civil War. Arsenals and armories in this list were active during the years of the confederacy and during the American Civil War.

See also
 Fayetteville Arsenal

References

American Civil War-related lists
Lists of places in the United States